Leskinen is a Finnish surname. Notable people with the surname include:

 August Leskinen (1876–1952)
 Viljo Leskinen (1908–1945)
 Kullervo Leskinen (1908–1989)
 Margit Leskinen (1915–2002)
 Väinö Leskinen (1917–1972)
 Juice Leskinen (1950–2006)
 Pekka Leskinen (born 1954)
 Janne Leskinen (born 1971)
 Kristi Leskinen (born 1981)
 Ville-Valtteri Leskinen (born 1994)

Fictional characters
 Alexis Leskinen, a Finnish-American neuroscientist in the Steins;Gate universe.

Finnish-language surnames